Aququcha (Quechua aqu sand, qucha lake, "sand lake", Hispanicized spelling Acococha) is a mountain in the Andes of Peru, about  high. It is located in the Lima Region, Oyón Province, Oyón District. Aququcha lies at the Puka Yaku valley, east of Kinwa Ukru.

References

Mountains of Peru
Mountains of Lima Region